Route nationale 3a  (RN 3a) is a secondary highway of 180 km in Madagascar, running along the western banks of Lake Alaotra to Andilamena. It crosses the region of Alaotra-Mangoro.

Selected locations on route
(north to south)
Andilamena (continues as RN 32)
Ankarefo
Amboavory
Tanambe
Ambohijanahary
Ambohitrarivo
Amparafaravola
intersection with RN 33 Bejofo and Morarano Gare
Bejofo
intersection with RN 44 near Andilanatoby

See also
List of roads in Madagascar
Transport in Madagascar

References

Roads in Alaotra-Mangoro
Roads in Madagascar